U.S. Gold Limited was a British video game publisher based in Witton, Birmingham, England. The company was founded in 1984 by Anne and Geoff Brown in parallel to their distributor firm, CentreSoft, both of which became part of Woodward Brown Holdings (later renamed CentreGold). The company primarily aimed at publishing games imported from the United States with a lower price tag in Europe and especially the United Kingdom.

History
In 1988, U.S. Gold received the Golden Joystick Award for "Software House of the Year". The company also operated the budget range label Kixx.

In 1988, the company struck a deal with Japanese company Capcom to port their arcade video games for home computers in Europe. The first four games they announced as part of the deal were ports of the 1987 arcade games Street Fighter, Tiger Road, 1943: The Battle of Midway and Black Tiger for the Commodore 64, ZX Spectrum, Amstrad CPC, Atari ST and Amiga platforms. Their first five Capcom releases sold over 250,000 copies in the UK by 1989, with their best-selling Capcom release up until then being Bionic Commando with over 70,000 UK sales. Their next Capcom release was Forgotten Worlds in 1989.

Games published

References 

Defunct companies based in Birmingham, West Midlands
Defunct video game companies of the United Kingdom
Eidos
Golden Joystick Award winners
Square Enix
Video game companies established in 1984
Video game companies disestablished in 1996
Video game publishers